Zeria is a genus of solifuges or sun spiders. The species of this genus are found in sub-Saharan Africa.

Species 

 Zeria adunca (Roewer, 1933)
 Zeria albistriata (Roewer, 1933)
 Zeria angolana (Frade, 1940)
 Zeria antelopicornis (Lawrence, 1929)
 Zeria atra (Roewer, 1933)
 Zeria atrisoma (Roewer, 1933)
 Zeria boehmi (Kraepelin, 1899)
 Zeria caffra (Pocock, 1897)
 Zeria capitulata (Karsch, 1885)
 Zeria carli (Roewer, 1933)
 Zeria celeripes (Hirst, 1911)
 Zeria davidi (Schenkel, 1932)
 Zeria farimia (Roewer, 1933)
 Zeria ferox (Pocock, 1895)
 Zeria fordi (Hirst, 1907)
 Zeria funksoni (Birula, 1915)
 Zeria fusca (C. L. Koch, 1842)
 Zeria glabricornis (Lawrence, 1928)
 Zeria greta (Roewer, 1933)
 Zeria incerta (Frade, 1940)
 Zeria kapangana (Benoit, 1960)
 Zeria keyserlingi (Pocock, 1895)
 Zeria kraepelini (Roewer, 1933)
 Zeria langheldi (Roewer, 1933)
 Zeria lawrencei (Roewer, 1933)
 Zeria lethalis (C. L. Koch, 1842)
 Zeria lobatula (Roewer, 1933)
 Zeria loveridgei (Hewitt, 1925)
 Zeria merope (Simon, 1879)
 Zeria meruensis (Tullgren, 1907)
 Zeria monteiri (Pocock, 1895)
 Zeria nasuta (Karsch, 1880)
 Zeria neumanni (Kraepelin, 1903)
 Zeria niassa (Karsch, 1880)
 Zeria obliqua (Roewer, 1933)
 Zeria obscura (Kraepelin, 1899)
 Zeria orthoceras (Roewer, 1933)
 Zeria paludicola (Pocock, 1895)
 Zeria parkinsoni (Pocock, 1897)
 Zeria persephone (Simon, 1879)
 Zeria recta (Hewitt, 1919)
 Zeria rhodesiana (Hirst, 1911)
 Zeria sagittaria (Pocock, 1900)
 Zeria schlechteri (Purcell, 1899)
 Zeria schoenlandi (Pocock, 1900)
 Zeria schoutedeni (Roewer, 1954)
 Zeria schweinfurthi (Karsch, 1880)
 Zeria sericea (Pocock, 1897)
 Zeria serraticornis (Purcell, 1899)
 Zeria spiralicornis (Purcell, 1903)
 Zeria strepsiceros (Kraepelin, 1899)
 Zeria striata (Kraepelin, 1914)
 Zeria sulfuripilosa (Roewer, 1933)
 Zeria toppini (Hewitt, 1916)
 Zeria umbonata (Roewer, 1933)
 Zeria vansoni (Lawrence, 1935)
 Zeria venator (Pocock, 1897)
 Zeria wabonica (Roewer, 1933)
 Zeria zebrina (Pocock 1898)

References 

 Simon, 1879 : Essai d'une classification des Galéodes, remarques synonymiques et description d'espèces nouvelles ou mal connues. Annales de la Société Entomologique de France, ser. 5, vol. 9, p. 93-154.

Solifugae genera
Arachnids of Africa